Donald James (born Donald James Wheal; 22 August 1931 – 28 April 2008) was a British television writer, novelist and non-fiction writer.

Life and career
Born in World's End, Chelsea, and educated at Sloane Grammar School and Pembroke College, Cambridge (where he read history), James completed his national service in the Parachute Regiment before returning to London to work as a supply teacher.

He was the author of the best-selling novels Vadim, Monstrum, The Fortune Teller and The Fall of the Russian Empire, as well as non-fiction books such as The Penguin Dictionary of the Third Reich. He wrote under a number of pseudonyms, notably Thomas Dresden and James Barwick (originally in collaboration with fellow writer Tony Barwick, another long-term contributor to the various television productions of Gerry and Sylvia Anderson and their company, AP Films/Century 21).

James's career as a scriptwriter included work on TV series such as The Adventurer, The Avengers, The Champions, Department S, Joe 90, Mission: Impossible, The Persuaders!, The Protectors, Randall and Hopkirk (Deceased), The Saint, The Secret Service, Space: 1999, Terrahawks and UFO. He wrote for a total of 22 titles, including the Century 21 film Doppelgänger, and acted in small three roles between 1961 and 1962.

After spending periods in France and Ireland, he returned to London. His autobiographical account of London life during World War II, World's End, was published in 2005. A second volume of memoirs, White City, was published in March 2007.

James died in London on 28 April 2008. Married three times and divorced once, he is survived by twin daughters.

References

External links

1931 births
2008 deaths
20th-century British novelists
21st-century British novelists
Alumni of Pembroke College, Cambridge
British autobiographers
British non-fiction writers
British male screenwriters
British television writers
People from Chelsea, London
Writers from London
British male novelists
20th-century English male writers
21st-century English male writers
British male television writers
20th-century British screenwriters
20th-century non-fiction writers
Male non-fiction writers
20th-century pseudonymous writers
21st-century pseudonymous writers